The 2007 Calgary Stampeders season was the 50th season for the team in the Canadian Football League and their 69th overall. After promising 2nd-place finishes in the West Division in 2005 (11–7) and 2006 (10–8) they finished 3rd in the West Division in 2007, with a disappointing 7–10–1 record, their first losing record in three seasons. They were defeated in the Western Semi-Final 26–24 by the eventual Grey Cup champion Saskatchewan Roughriders. The season was the last in which the team recorded more than two consecutive losses in the regular season in 10 years, recording three consecutive losses to close out the 2017 Calgary Stampeders season.

Offseason

CFL Draft
The 2007 CFL Draft took place on Wednesday, May 2, 2007 where the Stampeders made eight selections including three in the first round.

Preseason

Regular season

Season standings

Season schedule

Week 1: vs. Hamilton Tiger-Cats

at McMahon Stadium, Calgary, Alberta
Kickoff time: 8:00 p.m. MDT
Attendance: 29,157
Televised by: CBC
The Stampeders' opened the season with a strong performance, defeating the Hamilton Tiger-Cats 37–9. Quarterback Henry Burris opened the scoring with a 10-yard touchdown pass to Nik Lewis within the first five minutes of the first quarter. In the second quarter Tiger-Cat cornerback Dwight Anderson committed a costly illegal block on a punt return; the penalty resulted in the Tiger-Cat offence being sent back to their own goal line. Tiger-Cat quarterback Jason Maas's pass on the ensuing play was nearly intercepted by Cornelius Anthony. On the following play his pass was caught by Brock Ralph (older brother of Stampeder Brett Ralph) in their end zone, but the ball was knocked from Ralph's hands by Crance Clemons, and halfback Jermaine Chatman picked up the fumble for another Stampeder touchdown. Maas was pulled in the fourth quarter in favour of rookie Timmy Chang, but he was unable to produce more points: the Stampeders defence limited the Tiger-Cats offence to Nick Setta's three field goals.

The game was delayed twice in the second quarter by a rabbit, one of many that roam the University of Calgary campus, that made its way onto the field.

Week 2: at Saskatchewan Roughriders

at Mosaic Stadium at Taylor Field, Regina, Saskatchewan
Kickoff time: 5:00 p.m. CST
Attendance: 25,862
Televised by: TSN
The Stampeders were unable to carry forward any of the momentum from their defeat of the Tiger-Cats the week earlier, as the Roughriders went on to defeat them handily. Henry Burris threw a pass to Joffrey Reynolds for the Stampeders' only touchdown, in the first quarter. The Stampeders led the game 8–7 at the end of the first quarter, but the Roughriders defence smothered the Stampeders offence for the rest of the game. Burris was limited to 12 completions in 25 pass attempts for 124 yards before being replaced by Akili Smith. Smith's efforts were even more futile, completing only 6 passes for 64 yards and throwing an interception.

Week 3: at Toronto Argonauts

at Rogers Centre, Toronto, Ontario
Kickoff time: 3:00 p.m. EDT
Attendance: 29,304
Televised by: TSN
The Stampeders' offensive and defensive woes continued this week, being heavily defeated by the Argonauts. The defence surrendered five touchdowns, five converts and two field goals in the first three quarters, while the offence failed to record a point until punter Burke Dales scored a single at the beginning of the fourth quarter. Henry Burris threw a touchdown to Jeremaine Copeland later in the quarter, but was generally ineffective. Running back Joffrey Reynolds was limited to a paltry 39 yards rushing on 10 carries. Akili Smith replaced Burris in the first half and was again limited to six completed passes while throwing three interceptions, consequently being pulled in favour of Burris.

Week 4: vs. Toronto Argonauts

at McMahon Stadium, Calgary, Alberta
Kickoff time: 5:00 p.m. MDT
Attendance: 28,202
Televised by: CBC
After two miserable losses in Regina and Toronto in the previous two weeks the Stampeders returned home to the confines of McMahon Stadium. Argonaut quarterback Michael Bishop, who had a stellar game the week before, sat out this game due to having broken his wrist. Mike McMahon started in his place. Unlike Bishop, McMahon was unable to generate any points for the Argonauts. He began the game auspiciously throwing incompletions in his first five passing attempts, and could not recover. Veteran Damon Allen replaced him at the start of the second half with the score standing at 13–3 for the Stampeders. The Stampeders padded their lead in the fourth quarter with two Sandro DeAngelis field goals and touchdowns to Marc Boerigter and Trey Young. The latter was thrown by receiver Brett Ralph on a fake field goal play. The Argonauts failed to register any more points until the final play of the game, in which Allen threw a touchdown pass to rookie Obed Cétoute.

Week 5: vs. BC Lions

at McMahon Stadium, Calgary, Alberta
Kickoff time: 5:00 p.m. MDT
Attendance: 28,564
Televised by: CBC
BC came into this game with a perfect 4–0 record. Starting quarterback Dave Dickenson was out of the lineup with a concussion, and back-up Buck Pierce played with sore ribs, but the Stampeders were unable to stop the potent Lions offence while unable to generate their own. The Stamps finished the first quarter with a measly 21 yards of offence. They regained composure in the second quarter, scoring 11 points to tie the game before the end of the half. Sandro DeAngelis missed a 46-yard field goal attempt with 10 seconds remaining in the half. Unfortunately for the Stampeders they allowed the Lions to retake control of the game in the third quarter with two touchdowns. Henry Burris threw several key interceptions, among them one to Korey Banks in the Lions' end zone in the third quarter on a play which would have tied the game and another to  LaVar Glover in the fourth quarter, giving the Lions excellent field position to score the winning touchdown.

With the loss the Stampeders fell to last place in the West Division, one point behind the Eskimos.

Week 6: at Edmonton Eskimos

at Commonwealth Stadium, Edmonton, Alberta
Kickoff time: 5:00 p.m. MDT
Attendance: 32,644
Televised by: CBC
The Stampeders and Eskimos offences started off this game quite poorly, managing to produce only a field goal and a single, respectively, in the first quarter. The Stampeders scored the first touchdown in the second quarter on a pass from Henry Burris to Brett Ralph. Eskimo kicker Sean Fleming kicked a field goal, a single on the ensuing kickoff, and another field goal in the span of 3:33 to keep the game close. Burris threw another touchdown late in the quarter to Jeremaine Copeland after penalties to the Eskimos (A.J. Gass and Kenny Onatolu were ejected) gave them excellent field position, but the Eskimos responded with a touchdown of their own, a pass from Ricky Ray to Tyler Ebell, before the end of the half. The Eskimos took the lead in the third quarter on a touchdown pass to Kamau Peterson, but Sandro DeAngelis regained the Stampeders' lead with a field goal and a single. Joffrey Reynolds ran into the end zone for another touchdown to solidify the slim lead, but another touchdown pass to Peterson and field goal by Fleming gave the Eskimos a 32–31 lead with only 1:38 left in the game. The Eskimos had been in excellent position to score a touchdown after a roughing the kicker penalty put them only 13 yards from the Stampeders end zone with a 1st down, but they were unable to score the major and resorted to Fleming's field goal. The inability to score a touchdown in that key moment may have cost the Eskimos the game, as it left the Stampeders in the position to take the lead and win the game with only a safety or field goal. After a final drive to the Eskimos end zone in the last minute of the game the Stampeders offence set up DeAngelis for a 34-yard field goal attempt with no time left. DeAngelis's attempt was good, and the Stampeders won the game 34–32.

Week 7: at Montreal Alouettes

at Percival Molson Memorial Stadium, Montreal, Quebec
Kickoff time: 7:30 p.m. EDT
Attendance: 20,202
Televised by: TSN, RDS

Week 8: vs. BC Lions

at McMahon Stadium, Calgary, Alberta
Kickoff time: 8:00 p.m. MDT
Attendance: 30,826
Televised by: TSN

Week 10: vs. Edmonton Eskimos

at McMahon Stadium, Calgary, Alberta
Kickoff time: 2:00 p.m. MDT
Attendance: 35,650
Televised by: CBC

Week 11: at Edmonton Eskimos

at Commonwealth Stadium, Edmonton, Alberta
Kickoff time: 7:00 p.m. MDT
Attendance: 42,329
Televised by: TSN

Week 12: vs. Saskatchewan Roughriders

at McMahon Stadium, Calgary, Alberta
Kickoff time: 2:00 p.m. MDT
Attendance: 35,650
Televised by: TSN

Week 13: at Hamilton Tiger-Cats

at Ivor Wynne Stadium, Hamilton, Ontario
Kickoff time: 7:30 p.m. EDT
Attendance: 23,115
Televised by: TSN

Week 14: at BC Lions

at BC Place Stadium, Vancouver, British Columbia
Kickoff time: 7:00 p.m. PDT
Attendance: 32,263
Televised by: CBC

Week 15: vs. Saskatchewan Roughriders

at McMahon Stadium, Calgary, Alberta
Kickoff time: 2:00 p.m. MDT
Attendance: 33,075
Televised by: CBC

Week 16: vs. Winnipeg Blue Bombers

at McMahon Stadium, Calgary, Alberta
Kickoff time: 2:00 p.m. MDT
Attendance: 30,897
Televised by: TSN

Week 17: at Winnipeg Blue Bombers

at Canad Inns Stadium, Winnipeg, Manitoba
Kickoff time: 7:00 p.m. CDT
Attendance: 23,955
Televised by: TSN

Week 18: vs. Montreal Alouettes

at McMahon Stadium, Calgary, Alberta
Kickoff time: 5:00 p.m. MDT
Attendance: 29,247
Televised by: TSN

Week 19: at BC Lions

at BC Place Stadium, Vancouver, British Columbia
Kickoff time: 7:00 p.m. PDT
Attendance: 34,242
Televised by: TSN

Postseason

Schedule

Western Semi-Final
 

The Saskatchewan Roughriders rode the foot of Luca Congi and the arm and legs of Kerry Joseph to a 26–24 victory over the Calgary Stampeders at Mosaic Stadium at Taylor Field.  Congi matched a season high and tied a league playoff record with six field goals, while Joseph passed for 395 yards and added another 108 on the ground in the first playoff game in Regina in 19 years.

Statistics

Passing
Note: Att = Attempts; Comp = Completions; % = Completions/Attempts; Avg = Yards/Completion; Long = Longest Completion (in yards); Int = Interceptions; TD = Touchdowns

Receiving
Note: Rec = Receptions; Avg = Yards/Reception; Long = Longest Reception (yards); TD = Touchdowns

Rushing
Note: Avg = Yards/Carry; Long = Longest Carry (yards); TD = Touchdowns

Kicking
Note: Att = Attempted field goals; Good = Good field goals; Avg = Yards/kick; Long = Longest kick (yards); KO = Kickoffs; Sing = Singles

Punting

Defence
Note: DTkl = Defensive Tackles; STTkl = Special Teams Tackles; TotTkl = Total Tackles; Int = Interceptions; IntTD = Touchdowns on interceptions; FumR = Fumble Recoveries; Forced = Forced fumbles; FumTD = Touchdowns on fumbles; KD = Knock Downs

Awards and records

2007 CFL All-Stars
 None

References

Calgary Stampeders
Calgary Stampeders seasons
2007 in Alberta